Christian of the World is the second solo studio album by Tommy James and was released in 1971.  It reached #131 on the Billboard 200.

Many of the songs were a more open exploration of the artist's Christian faith, something which he has said had informed a number of his earlier works, but with the religious elements more obscured to make them palatable for Top 40 radio.

The album had four singles that charted.  The biggest hit was "Draggin' the Line" that reached #2 in Canada, #4 on the Billboard Hot 100, and #6 on the U.S. adult contemporary chart. "I'm Comin' Home" reached #19 in Canada and #40 in the U.S.  "Church Street Soul Revival" reached #55 in Canada and #62 in the U.S.  "Adrienne" reached #93 in the U.S.

Track listing 
All songs written and composed by Tommy James and Bob King except where noted.

Side 1
 "Christian of the World" - 2:45
 "Rings and Things" (James) - 1:55
 "I'm Comin' Home" - 2:03
 "Sing, Sing, Sing" (James) - 3:05
 "Draggin' the Line" - 2:45
 "Sail a Happy Ship" - 3:15
 "Light of Day" - 3:46

Side 2
 "Bits and Pieces" - 2:30
 "I Believe in People" - 2:26
 "Church Street Soul Revival" (Ritchie Cordell, James) - 3:15
 "Another Hill to Climb" - 3:10
 "Adrienne" - 2:40
 "Silk, Satin, Carriage Waiting" - 2:49

Personnel
Background vocals: The Stephentown Singers
Producer: Bob King, Tommy James
Arranger: Jimmy Wisner
Engineer: Bruce Staple
Recorded at: Allegro Sound Studios

Charts
Album

Singles

References

1971 albums
Roulette Records albums